George Damien Nurse (born 30 April 1999) is an English professional footballer who plays as a full back for Shrewsbury Town.

Career
On 12 July 2019, Nurse joined League Two side Newport County on a season long loan. He made his debut for Newport on 13 August 2019 in the starting line up for the EFL Cup first round win against Gillingham. On 5 October 2019 Nurse scored his first goal for Newport, the 96th minute winning goal in the League Two 1–0 win against Carlisle United.

On 7 August 2020, Nurse signed for League Two side Walsall on loan until the end of the season.

On 28 July 2021, Nurse joined League One side Shrewsbury Town for an undisclosed fee, signing a two-year deal. On 24 September 2022, Nurse went off injured after an hour in a 2–1 victory over Burton Albion, the injury later revealed to be a ruptured anterior cruciate ligament.

Career statistics

References

External links

1999 births
Living people
English footballers
Association football defenders
Bristol City F.C. players
Weston-super-Mare A.F.C. players
Newport County A.F.C. players
Walsall F.C. players
Shrewsbury Town F.C. players
National League (English football) players
English Football League players